B-Girl is a 2009 dance film written and directed by Emily Dell and starring Julie Urich, Missy Yager, Wesley Jonathan, Drew Sidora, Aimee Garcia, James Martinez and based on director Emily Dell's 2004 short film of the same name.

Plot
In Brooklyn, Angel is a breakdancer who lives with her mother Gabby. Her abusive boyfriend Hector won't accept that she wants to break up. One night Angel and her best friend Rosie trade hats and jackets and Hector fatally stabs Rosie thinking she is Angel. When he realizes his mistake he stabs Angel too. After many weeks of recovery, Angel wants to breakdance again but is having difficulty. Gabby moves with Angel to Los Angeles to live with Angel's grandmother, where she believes Angel will be safe. Angel gets a night job at a car rental company and goes to college during the day. She also joins a group of breakdancers who need a sixth member to compete.

Cast
 Julie Urich as Angel
 Missy Yager as Gabby 
 Wesley Jonathan as Carlos 
 Drew Sidora as Righteous 
 Aimee Garcia as Rosie 
 James Martinez as Hector 
 Richard Yniguez as Father Rivera 
 Jenny Gago as Crescencia 
 Oren Michaeli as Tejon
 Jonathan Perez as Rico 
 Keith Stallworth as Junior
 Richard Steelo Vasquez as Silas
 Ivan Velez as Trece 
 Marcelo Tubert as Professor Leasing 
 Robert Cicchini as Dr. Volchek 
 Josue Figueroa as Beast 
 Bunnie Rivera as Maria

References

External links 

American dance films
2000s English-language films